BIRD (Bispectral and Infrared Remote Detection) is a satellite launched by ISRO in 2001 for DLR. This small (92 kg) boxlike system, with solar panel two collectors on stub wings, has remarkable fire-detection qualities. It hosts a two-channel infrared sensor system in combination with a Wide-Angle Optoelectronic Stereo Scanner (WAOSS). It also features a neuronal network classificator in orbit to reduce downlink bandwidth and cost.

The unique combination of a stereo camera and two infrared cameras gives the opportunity to acquire:

 More precise information about leaf mass and photosynthesis for the early diagnosis of vegetation condition and changes
 Real time discrimination between smoke and water clouds

The attitude&control system of the BIRD satellite was reused in the TET-1 satellite.

Publications 
 A BIRD satellite architecture (in German) (pdf)

O. Maibaum, T. Terzibaschian, "Lessons learned from the Object-Oriented Design of the BIRD Attitude Control System Software", 16th IFAC Symposium on Automatic Control in Aerospace (ACA'2004), ACA'2004 Preprints (Vol.I), S. 156-161, St.Petersburg, 14–18 June 2004

See also 

Miniaturized satellite
TET-1

References

Satellites orbiting Earth
Spacecraft launched in 2001